Dazhai or Tachai is a village in Shanxi made famous in the "Learn from Dazhai in agriculture" campaign.

It may also refer to the following places in mainland China:

Towns (大寨镇)
Dazhai, Qiaojia County, in Qiaojia County, Yunnan
Dazhai, Yun County, Yunnan, in Yun County, Yunnan

Townships (大寨乡)
Dazhai Township, Hua County, Henan
Dazhai Township, Ziyun County, in Ziyun Miao and Buyei Autonomous County, Guizhou
Dazhai Township, Tianquan County, in Tianquan County, Sichuan
Dazhai Township, Jinping Miao, Yao, and Dai Autonomous County, in Jinping Miao, Yao, and Dai Autonomous County, Yunnan
Dazhai Township, Qiaojia County, in Qiaojia County, Yunnan